Arius brunellii is a species of sea catfish in the family Ariidae. It was described by Giacomo Zolezzi in 1939. It is known only from the Giuba River in Somalia; its type locality.

References

Endemic fauna of Somalia
brunellii
Fish described in 1939